Dera Ismail Khan District (often abbreviated as D.I. Khan) is a district in Dera Ismail Khan Division of Khyber Pakhtunkhwa province in Pakistan. The capital of the district is the town of Dera Ismail Khan.

Geography 
The district of Dera Ismail Khan is bounded on the east by the Bhakkar and Dera Ghazi Khan districts of Punjab. Eastern portions of the district along the Indus River are characterized by fertile alluvial plains, while lands farther from the river consist of clay soil cut by ravines from rainfall. The district is bounded on the southwest by a thin strip of the South Waziristan district, formerly of the Federally Administered Tribal Areas, which separates D.I Khan from the Takht-e-Sulaiman Mountain in the neighboring Baluchistan province. In the northwest is the Tank District.

D.I Khan is separated from the Marwat plains of the Lakki Marwat district by a spur of clay and sandstone hills that stretch east from the Sulaiman Mountains to the Indus River known as the Sheikh Badin Hills. The highest peak in the range is the limestone Sheik Badin Mountain, which is protected by the Sheikh Badin National Park. Near the Indus River is a spur of limestone hills known as the Kafir Kot hills, where the ancient Hindu complex of Kafir Kot is located.
DI Khan is also considered the center of Pakistan because of its location between Bhakkar of South Punjab, Mianwali of North Punjab, Zhob of Balochistan and South Waziristan of Pakistan tribal belt.

History 
It is named after Baloch mercenary Ismail Khan, son of Malik Sohrab Dodai, who laid the foundation of the area.

The Dera Ismail Khan District is littered with ruins from ancient civilizations. Dera Ismail Khan is home to the collection of Hindu ruins from two separate sites 20 miles apart, jointly known as Kafir Kot.

The region came under the influence of the Nanda Empire of ancient India from 300 BCE. With the rise of Chandragupta Maurya, the region came under the complete control of the Mauryan Empire. Afterward, the region was briefly and nominally controlled by the Shunga Empire. However, with the decline of the Shungas, the region passed to local Hindu and Buddhist rulers and was interrupted by foreign rulers. Many of these foreign rulers, like the Indo-Parthians, Sakas, and Kushans converted to Hinduism and Buddhism, and promoted these Indian religions throughout Central and South Asia. The region reached its height under the Buddhist ruler Kanishka the Great. After the fall of the Kushans, the region came under the control of the Gupta Empire of ancient India. During this period, Hindu and Buddhist art and architecture flourished in the area.

With the decline of the imperial Guptas, the Hindu Shahis came to rule the area. The Hindu Shahis built two massive forts in the northern edges of Dera Ismail Khan. The forts were later renamed as "Kafirkots" (forts of the infidel). These Hindu Shahi forts were known for high towers and steep defensive walls. The Hindus also built many Hindu temples around the area, however, many of them are now in rubble. The Hindu Shahis remained in control of the area until their defeat by the Turkic Muslim army of Ghaznavids.

The district is part of what was historically territory inhabited by the Baluch people during medieval India, who were invited to settle the region by Shah Husseyn, of the Langah Sultanate of Multan. These Baluch settlers were displaced by or assimilated into, later waves of Pashtun settlement.

Dera Ismail Khan was created as an administrative unit of British India, part of the Derajat Division of the North-West Frontier Province. It was formerly divided into two almost equal portions by the Indus River, which intersected it from north to south. To the west of the Indus, the characteristics of the country resembled those of Dera Ghazi Khan. To the east of the present bed of the river, there is a wide track known as the Kachi, exposed to river action. Beyond this, the country rises abruptly, and a barren, almost desert plain stretches eastwards, sparsely cultivated, and inhabited by nomadic tribes. In 1901, the trans-Indus tract was allotted to the newly formed North-West Frontier Province, the cis-Indus tract remaining in the Punjab jurisdiction. The cis-Indus portions of the Dera Ismail Khan and Bannu districts now comprise the new Punjab district of Mianwali. Wheat and wool were exported. In 1947, it became part of the newly independent Pakistan.

In 2016, 191,000 acres in the district were brought under cultivation with completion of the Gomal Zam Dam, and a series of irrigation canals partially funded by the United States Government.

Demography 

At the time of the 2017 census the district had a population of 1,693,594, of which 873,041 were males and 820,447 females. Rural population was 1,333,376 (78.73%) while the urban population was 360,218 (21.27%). The literacy rate was 43.34% - the male literacy rate was 56.55% while the female literacy rate was 29.39%.

At the time of the 2017 census, 64.23% of the population spoke Saraiki, 32.97% Pashto and 2.08% Urdu as their first language.

Tribes 
There are number of Baloch, Jat and Pathan tribes along with many other castes. Baloch and Jat in Dera Ismail Khan speak Saraiki as their mother tongue and mostly Baloch belongs to Korai, Lashari, Pitafi, Kulachi Tribes. Local Pashtuns of here are mostly of Marwat,Gandapur, Kundi, Mian Khel, Mahsood, Wazir and Bhittani tribes. Among these tribes Marwat and Gandapur are the major tribes of Pashtuns in Dera Ismail Khan residing in Tehsil Paniala, Paharpur and Kulachi respectively.

Religion

Education

The Dera Ismail Khan district has many schools and colleges, predominantly in the capital of Dera Ismail Khan. 
University of Agriculture, Dera Ismail Khan
Gomal University- Two campuses in Dera Ismail Khan
St. Helen's High School & College
Qurtuba University
Gomal Medical College
University Wensam College
Shawn School & College Paharpur
Punjab College Meraj Campus
Dar-e-Arqam School Dera Ismail Khan
The City School Dera Ismail Khan
Government College of Technology, Dera Ismail Khan campus
Beaconhouse School System
Overseas Pakistan Foundation School
Educare School
Knowledge Home
LEEDS School & College
 Islamabad Schools
 Mufti Mehmood Public School & College

Politics 
The district is represented in the National Assembly by two elected MNAs who represent the following constituencies:

Provincial Assembly

Cuisine and Food 
Sobat is a traditional dish predominantly prepared in the capital of Dera Ismail Khan. It consists of chicken, onions, garlic, tomatoes, khusk dhania, garam masala, turmeric, and other spices. It is usually eaten as dinner. Sobat is known all over Pakistan, and brings a lot of attention to the district and city.

Sports 

Football is a very popular game in Dera Ismail Khan. D I Khan produces one of the best footballers in the country. Most of the players can't participate in national team because of Faisal Saleh Hayat they play well in foreign football leagues in Iran, Afghanistan, Turkey, and many other countries. Other games including cricket, hockey, badminton, and many more are played as well. Ali Amin Khan has also provided a platform for more involvement in sports in this region. In 2017 he introduced a tennis ball cricket league, named Dera Premier League, and the teams from different geographical regions of Pakistan competed. Season two was held in 2018. DPL became Pakistan's biggest tape ball cricket tournament.

Dera Ismail Khan has a cricket team as well: Dera Ismail Khan cricket team.

Administration

The district is subdivided into five Tehsils which contain a total of 47 Union Councils:

Tehsils
 D.I. Khan
 Kulachi
 Paharpur
 Paroa
 Drazanda (formerly Frontier Region Dera Ismail Khan)

After the merger of Tribal areas, Darazinda is now also a tehsil of D.I.Khan.

See also

 Dera Ismail Khan
 Pakistan
 National Assembly of Pakistan
 Tehsil
Khyber Pakhtunkhwa
 Sport in Pakistan
 President of Pakistan
 Arif Alvi
 Pakistani cuisine

References

 
Districts of Khyber Pakhtunkhwa